Steven Myles Walsh (born September 11, 1973, in Boston, Massachusetts
) is an American politician who represented the 11th Essex district in the Massachusetts House of Representatives from 2005 to 2014. He is also a practicing attorney and adjunct faculty member of North Shore Community College's Public Policy Institute. He received his J.D. (2005) from the New England School of Law and his B.A. (1995) from Wesleyan University. He resigned March 5, 2014, to become executive director of the Massachusetts Council of Community Hospitals.

On September 18, 2017, he was named CEO of the Massachusetts Health and Hospital Association.

References

1973 births
Democratic Party members of the Massachusetts House of Representatives
Politicians from Lynn, Massachusetts
Wesleyan University alumni
New England Law Boston alumni
Living people